Michal Jagelka is a Czech actor and voice actor, known for dubbing Leonardo DiCaprio, Matt Damon, Orlando Bloom and Bradley Cooper.

Biography 
Michal was born 17 April 1977 in Prague, Czechoslovakia. He studied at the Prague Conservatory. He hosted in a radio Golden Prague.

Theatre

Háta Theatre Company
Smrt Hippodmaie (2002) .... Thyest
Blázinec v prvním patře
Vlčí srdce
Jsme holt už takový
Prázdniny snů .... Arnaud Fauchin
Na správné adrese .... Jean

Jaroslav Ježek Conservatory
Tartuff .... Molière
Slaměný klobouk .... Felix

Filmography

TV series 
Nováci (1995)
Hospoda (1996)
Ulice (2005)

Dubbing roles 

 Matt Damon
 Will & Grace (Owen)
 House of Lies (Himself)
 Saving Private Ryan (James Francis Ryan)
 The Talented Mr. Ripley (Tom Ripley)
 Rounders (Mike McDermott)
 Good Will Hunting (Will Hunting)
 Dogma (Loki)
 Ocean's Eleven (Linus Caldwell)
 Ocean's Twelve (Linus Caldwell)
 Syriana (Bryan Woodman)
 The Brothers Grimm (Will Grimm)
 Ocean's Thirteen (Linus Caldwell)
 The Good Shepherd (Edward Wilson)
 Jersey Girl (PR Exec.)
 The Informant! (Mark Whitacre)
 Hereafter (George Lonegan)
 Green Zone (Roy Miller)
 The Rainmaker (Rudy Baylor)
 True Grit (LaBoeuf)
 Invictus (Francois Pienaar)
 The Adjustment Bureau (David Norris)
 Contagion (Mitch Emhoff)
 Stuck on You (Bob Tenor)
 We Bought a Zoo (Benjamin Mee)
 Promised Land (Steve Butler)
 Margaret (Mr. Aaron)
 Behind the Candelabra (Scott Thorson)
 The Monuments Men (James Granger)
 Thor: Ragnarok (Loki actor)
 Stillwater (Bill Baker)
 Leonardo DiCaprio
 Critters 3 (Josh)
 Romeo + Juliet (Romeo Montague)
 Titanic (Jack Dawson)
 The Man in the Iron Mask (King Louis XIV / Philippe)
 Marvin's Room (Hank Lacker)
 The Beach (Richard)
 Total Eclipse (Arthur Rimbaud)
 Catch Me If You Can (Frank Abagnale)
 Gangs of New York (Amsterdam Vallon)
 The Aviator (Howard Hughes)
 The Departed (William "Billy" Costigan Jr.)
 Blood Diamond (Daniel "Danny" Archer)
 Body of Lies (Roger Ferris)
 Revolutionary Road (Frank Wheeler)
 Hubble (Narrator)
 Shutter Island (Edward "Teddy" Daniels)
 Inception (Dom Cobb)
 J. Edgar (J. Edgar Hoover)
 The Great Gatsby (Jay Gatsby)
 The Wolf of Wall Street (Jordan Belfort)
 Before the Flood (Narrator)
 Once Upon a Time in Hollywood (Rick Dalton)
 Don't Look Up (Dr. Randall Mindy)
 Orlando Bloom
 The Lord of the Rings: The Fellowship of the Ring (Legolas)
 Pirates of the Caribbean: The Curse of the Black Pearl (Will Turner)
 The Lord of the Rings: The Two Towers (Legolas)
 Troy (Paris)
 The Lord of the Rings: The Return of the King (Legolas)
 The Calcium Kid (Jimmy "The Calcium Kid" Connelly)
 Kingdom of Heaven (Balian of Ibelin)
 Pirates of the Caribbean: Dead Man's Chest (Will Turner)
 Elizabethtown (Drew Baylor)
 Pirates of the Caribbean: At World's End (Will Turner)
 The Three Musketeers (George Villiers, 1st Duke of Buckingham)
 The Hobbit: The Desolation of Smaug (Legolas)
 The Hobbit: The Battle of the Five Armies (Legolas)
 Zulu (Brian Epkeen)
 Pirates of the Caribbean: Dead Men Tell No Tales (Will Turner)
 Unlocked (Jack Alcott)
 The Outpost (Captain Benjamin D. Keating)
Bradley Cooper
Alias (Will Tippin)
The Hangover (Phil Wenneck)
I Want to Marry Ryan Banks (Todd Doherty)
He's Just Not That Into You (Ben)
The A-Team (Templeton Peck)
The Hangover Part II (Phil Wenneck)
Silver Linings Playbook (Patrizio "Pat" Solitano Jr.)
The Hangover Part III (Phil Wenneck)
Michael Winslow
Police Academy (Cadet Larvell Jones)
Police Academy 2: Their First Assignment (Officer Larvell Jones)
Police Academy 3: Back in Training (Sergeant Larvell Jones)
Police Academy 4: Citizens on Patrol (Sergeant Larvell Jones)
Police Academy 5: Assignment Miami Beach (Sergeant Larvell Jones)
Police Academy 6: City Under Siege (Sergeant Larvell Jones)
Police Academy: Mission to Moscow (Sergeant Larvell Jones)
Ethan Hawke
White Fang (Jack Conroy)
White Fang 2: Myth of the White Wolf (Jack Conroy)
Great Expectations (Finnegan "Finn" Bell)
Before the Devil Knows You're Dead (Hank Hanson)
Sinister (Ellison Oswalt)

Personal life 
He is in civil union with Czech TV host Aleš Cibulka.

References

External links

Michal Jagelka (televize.cz) 
Michal Jagelka at the Czech-Slovak Film Database 

1977 births
20th-century Czech male actors
21st-century Czech male actors
Living people
Male actors from Prague
Czech male film actors
Czech male stage actors
Czech male television actors
Czech male voice actors
Czech gay actors